The 1993–94 AHL season was the 58th season of the American Hockey League. Sixteen teams played 80 games each in the schedule. The St. John's Maple Leafs finished first overall in the regular season. The Portland Pirates won their first Calder Cup championship.

It was the final season for founding member Springfield Indians, which would move to Worcester the following year after 52 years in Springfield.

Team changes
 The Utica Devils move to Saint John, New Brunswick, becoming the Saint John Flames, playing in the Atlantic Division.
 The Baltimore Skipjacks move to Portland, Maine, becoming the Portland Pirates, playing in the North Division.
 The Halifax Citadels move to Cornwall, Ontario, becoming the Cornwall Aces, playing in the South Division.
 The Capital District Islanders move to Albany, New York, becoming the Albany River Rats.
 The New Haven Senators move to Charlottetown, Prince Edward Island, becoming the Prince Edward Island Senators, playing in the Atlantic Division.

Final standings
Note: GP = Games played; W = Wins; L = Losses; T = Ties; GF = Goals for; GA = Goals against; Pts = Points;

Scoring leaders

Note: GP = Games played; G = Goals; A = Assists; Pts = Points; PIM = Penalty minutes

 Complete list

Calder Cup playoffs

For the Semifinal round, the team that earned the most points during the regular season out of the three remaining teams receives a bye directly to the Calder Cup Final.

Trophy and award winners

Team awards

Individual awards

Other awards

See also
List of AHL seasons

References
AHL official site
AHL Hall of Fame
HockeyDB

 
American Hockey League seasons
2
2